HD 181433 d is an extrasolar planet located approximately 87 light years away in the constellation of Pavo, orbiting the star HD 181433. This planet has a minimum mass of 0.54 Jupiter mass and takes 2172 days to orbit the star. The average orbital distance is 3.00 AU. At periastron distance, it will have distance from the star similar to Mars’ distance from the Sun at 1.56 AU. At apastron, the distance is 4.44 AU. These corresponds to the orbital eccentricity of 0.48.

References

External links 
 

HD 181433
Pavo (constellation)
Exoplanets discovered in 2008
Giant planets
Exoplanets detected by radial velocity